Scarce Grease, also known as Scarse Grease or Rockaway, is an unincorporated community in Limestone County, Alabama, United States.

History
A post office operated under the name Rockaway from 1891 to 1904.

References

Unincorporated communities in Limestone County, Alabama
Unincorporated communities in Alabama